The Wickaboag Valley Historic District is a predominantly rural historic district in West Brookfield, Massachusetts.  It is roughly bounded by Wickaboag Pond, Mill Stone Rd., Madden Rd., and the border with New Braintree.  The central feature of the district is two branches of Sucker Brook, which empties into Wickaboag Pond, and the rural views of the valley through which these streams move.  Except for a cluster of houses near Wickaboag Valley, Shea, Ragged Hill, and Millstone Roads, buildings are sparsely arranged on the roads that pass through the district.  There are fourteen houses of historic interest, the oldest of which date to the 1790s.  There are also archaeological remnants of the area's early industrial history, with documented mill sites dating to the late 17th century.

The district was listed on the National Register of Historic Places in 2000.

See also
National Register of Historic Places listings in Worcester County, Massachusetts

References

Gallery

Historic districts in Worcester County, Massachusetts
National Register of Historic Places in Worcester County, Massachusetts
West Brookfield, Massachusetts
Historic districts on the National Register of Historic Places in Massachusetts